HK Beostar was an ice hockey club from Belgrade, Serbia that played in the binational Panonian League. It was based in the Novi Beograd part of Belgrade and had its own arena called Pingvin Hala. The club was founded in 2002, and its first adult league season was in 2006.

Season by season record
Note: GP = Games Played, W = Wins, L = Losses, T = Ties, OTL = Overtime Losses, Pts = Points, GF = Goals for, GA = Goals against

Honours

Serbian Hockey League:
Runners-up (2): 2014, 2015

Sport in Belgrade
Ice hockey teams in Serbia
Serbian Hockey League teams
Panonian League teams
New Belgrade